Naeem Ullah Gill is a Pakistani politician who was a Member of the Provincial Assembly of the Punjab, from May 2013 to May 2018.

Early life and education
He was born on 1 January 1985 in Faisalabad.

He completed ICS in 2002 from Punjab College in Faisalabad. He has the degree of Bachelor of Science (Hons) in Hotel Management which he received in 2005 from Intercollege Larnaca, Cyprus.

Political career

He was elected to the Provincial Assembly of the Punjab as an independent candidate from Constituency PP-61 (Faisalabad-XI) in 2013 Pakistani general election. He joined Pakistan Muslim League (N) in May 2013.

References

Living people
Punjab MPAs 2013–2018
1985 births
Pakistan Muslim League (N) politicians
Politicians from Faisalabad